Asoka Peiris (born 1942 – died 24 December 2007 as අශෝක පීරිස්) [Sinhala]), was a Sri Lankan actor in Sri Lankan cinema, stage drama and television. A highly versatile actor who mainly appeared in dramatic roles, Peiris is best known for the roles in Amba Yahaluwo and Guru Gedara.

Personal life
Ashoka Peiris was born in 1942 in Moratuwa, Colombo. His father died when he was about 16 years old. His preliminary education was at Presbyterian Girls' High School, Dehiwela and Ferguson's Girls' High School under Ms. Brooks. Then he attended S. Thomas' College, Mount Lavinia for secondary education. He was married to Chithra Peiris and the couple had two sons, Prakash and Eshantha, and one daughter, Menaka. After the marriage, he worked at Wellawatta Spinning and Weaving Mills, where he met Lester.

He had 6 grandchildren. Amrith, Dharaka & Amandhi are the children of his older son Prakash. Emma is the daughter of his second son Eshantha. Meshaak & Mareesha are the children of his daughter Menaka.

He died on 24 December 2007 due to a heart attack at the age of 65. His funeral took place in Holy Emmanuel Church Moratuwa. He was buried at the Holy Emmanuel Church Cemetery on 29th Friday, 2007 at 3 pm.

Acting career
In 1959, he produced a Sinhala play called Karolis and Porolis along with his friend Marapana during his last year at school.

He started his acting career with the stage play Pala Malla staged in 1965 with the main role. Then he acted in an English play directed by Lucien de Soyza. His maiden cinema acting came through Delovak Athara directed by Lester James Peries with a supportive role. His first main role in cinema was in Thana Giravi directed by Roy de Silva. In 1967, he directed the drama Sarana. In 1993, he won the Best Actor award at Sarasaviya Film Festival for his role in the film Guru Gedara.

In 1994, Peiris won the award for the Best Actor at Sarasaviya Film Festival for the role in Guru Gedara. He continued acting in some foreign movies such as Shadow of the Cobra and Death Stone. Some of his most critically acclaimed roles came through films including, Yuganthaya, Baddegama, Yahalu Yeheli, Viragaya and Maruthaya. His most notable television acting came through Amba Yahaluvo as Nelum Bandara, which became a cult in Sri Lankan television.

In 1994, he founded The Moratuwa Arts Forum (MAF), which launched many projects to identify Moratuwa talents and promote music. He worked as the chartered president of the forum from 1995 to 1996.

In 2004, he worked as the music composer of Jolly Boys and Haadu Wassak films.

Selected serials
 Amba Yahaluvo 
 Asani Wasi
 Awasan Horawa
 Duvili Maliga
 Jeewa Chakra 
 Mindada
 Rankira Soya 
 Sathya
 Senehase Nimnaya 
 Sihinayak Paata Paatin 
 Wara Peraliya

Filmography

See also
 Cinema of Sri Lanka

References

External links
 'Ulamage Rathriya' reveals the country's past

Sri Lankan male film actors
Sinhalese male actors
1942 births
2007 deaths